Washington County Historical Society may refer to:

 Washington County Historical Association, an organization based in Fort Calhoun, Nebraska, United States
 Washington County Historical Society, an organization in Florida, United States
 Washington County Historical Society, an organization in Ohio, United States
 Washington County Historical Society, an organization in Minnesota, United States
 Washington County Historical Society (Utah), an organization based in St. George, Utah, United States
 Washington County Historical Society, an organization in Wisconsin United States
Washington County Historical Society in Fayetteville, Arkansas

See also
 List of historical societies